Jack G. Thayer (November 22, 1922 – January 1, 1995) was an American broadcasting executive and disc jockey. Born in Chicago, he began his career in radio as a disc jockey in Minneapolis, Cleveland, and Sacramento, California. He was president of the NBC Radio Network from 1974 through 1980, and then was head of WNEW-AM (now WBBR) in New York City. After this he served as the C.E.O. and executive vice president of Gear Broadcasting International, a subsidiary of Gear Telecommunications, from the mid 1980s until his death on New Year's Day 1995 at St. Joseph's Hospital in Providence, Rhode Island.

References

External links
Jack Thayer at twincitiesmusichighlights.net

1922 births
1995 deaths
American radio DJs
American radio executives